Paul Ducuing (30 April 1867 – 9 March 1949) was a French sculptor.

Early life
Paul Ducuing was born on 1 March 1867 in Lannemezan. His father was a farmer. He graduated from the École des Beaux-Arts in Toulouse and the École nationale supérieure des Beaux-Arts in Paris.

Career

Ducuing exhibited his sculptures at the Salon, where he won medals in 1898, 1901 and 1906. He became a professor of sculpture at the Manufacture nationale de Sèvres in 1919. On top of teaching, he designed Sèvres figurines.

Ducuing designed public sculptures. For example, he designed Jéliotte in the Parc Beaumont in Pau in 1901. He also designed Monument à Françoise de Cezelli in Leucate. Additionally, he designed a statue of Jean Jaurès in Albi. He designed several sculptures in Carcassonne. He also designed World War I monuments in Castelsarrasin, Valence-d'Agen and Saint-Gaudens. He designed three sculptures in Toulouse, all of which are no longer there.

Ducuing was awarded the Legion of Honour.

Personal life and death
Ducuing married Countess François Simard de Pitray, the widow of Antonin Mercié, in 1922. He died on 9 March 1949 in Toulouse.

References

1867 births
1949 deaths
People from Hautes-Pyrénées
École des Beaux-Arts alumni
French male sculptors
19th-century French sculptors
20th-century French sculptors
19th-century French male artists